Reverse Runner (sometimes stylized as Яeverse Яunner) is an Australian comedy film written and directed by Lachlan Ryan and Jarrod Theodore, executive produced by Stephen Herek. It stars Dan Cannon, Dave Callan, Steve Moneghetti, Rosco Brauer and a special appearance from Olympic commentator Bruce McAvaney. It tells the story of teenager Kid Campbell, who dreams of becoming a reverse runner despite being mocked, ridiculed and kicked out of home for refusing to get an ordinary job. In the end, he is left to question his childhood dream.

It had a limited theatrical release on 11 October 2012, playing in cinemas until April 2013. It was released on DVD, Blu-ray, and VOD in Australia on 18 September 2013, and 30 October 2013 in New Zealand.

Cast
 Dan Cannon as Kid Campbell
 Dave Callan as a Commentator
 Steve Moneghetti as John Jones
 Rosco Brauer as Coach Leroy
 Bianca Linton as Hannah
 Julian Shaw as Steven James
 Bruce McAvaney as a Commentator
 Rhys Mitchell as a Commentator
 Justin Kennedy as Suicidal Starter
 Stephen Lopez as Head Helper
 Helen Bongers as Mum
 Daryl Cannon as Gary
 Casey Asplin as Young Kid Campbell

Production
Principal photography on Reverse Runner involved approximately 300 people throughout the duration of the shoot. The majority of the film was shot in the country town of Colac in Victoria. Other locations include the John Landy Athletics Field, Geelong; Melbourne Park; and the world-renowned landscapes at Lavers Hill along the Great Ocean Road.

Music
Thomas E. Rouch composed the orchestral score for the film. Rouch collaborated with singers James Cupples, Nicholas Roy, and Sid O'Neil, re-recording some of Australia's classic rock songs, including "Run to Paradise" by The Choirboys and "Most People I Know (Think That I'm Crazy)" by Billy Thorpe. Rouch and Cupples also re-recorded Walk Right In by Dr Hook.

Sid O'Neil, lead singer from the Vasco Era, recorded vocals for an original track titled "Backwards As They Come", which appears in the film. Tinpan Orange duo Emily and Jesse recorded vocals for an original music track titled "Fallen Dreams", produced by Thomas E. Rouch.

Marketing
Australian musical icon Mike Brady, who wrote football anthems "Up There Cazaly" and "One Day in September", recorded a voice-over for Reverse Runner’s trailer.

Release
On 11 October 2012, Reverse Runner was released theatrically at Colac Cinemas; it holds the record for the highest-grossing film at Colac Cinemas in 2012, and the film is also in the records due to being the third-highest-grossing film of all time at Colac Cinemas. Reverse Runner also screened at Village Cinemas Geelong, Ballarat's Regent Cinema, Warrnambool, Hamilton, Horsham, Ararat, and Echuca Cinemas in 2013.

Reception
Simon Foster of SBS awarded the film three and a half stars out of five: "Given that the past 12 months of Australian big-screen comedy has been arguably its direst ever, the amiably silly low-budgeter Reverse Runner comes as somewhat of a revelation. The debut work of writer/directors Jarrod Theodore and Lachlan Ryan and their production outfit Theory Pictures suggests that there may be a silver lining on the dark cloud that is Screen Australia’s policy on indie feature comedy funding."

References

External links
 
 

Australian comedy films
2012 films
2012 comedy films
2010s English-language films